The men's eight competition at the 1996 Summer Olympics in Atlanta, Georgia took place at Lake Lanier. It was held from 21 to 27 July. There were 10 boats (90 competitors) from 10 nations, with each nation limited to a single boat in the event. The event was won by the Netherlands, the nation's first victory in the men's eight and first medal of any color in the event since 1900. Germany took silver; it was the 9th time in the past 10 Games that a German team (Germany, United Team of Germany, East Germany, or West Germany) was on the podium, with the only exception being 1984 when no German boats competed. Russia earned bronze in its independent debut.

Background

This was the 22nd appearance of the event. Rowing had been on the programme in 1896 but was cancelled due to bad weather. The men's eight has been held every time that rowing has been contested, beginning in 1900.

Of the 10 nations competing, five had won medals in top-level competition in the last four years. Canada was the reigning Olympic champion, though it had not been on a World Championship podium since. Germany, the 1992 Olympic bronze winners, had taken gold at the 1993 and 1995 World Championships. The 1994 World Champion was the United States, which had also earned bronze in 1993 and 1995. Dutch crews had been runners-up in 1994 and 1995. Romania had taken silver at the 1992 Olympics and 1993 World Championship, as well as bronze in 1994.

Russia and Ukraine each made their debut in the event. The United States made its 19th appearance, most among nations to that point.

Competition format

The "eight" event featured nine-person boats, with eight rowers and a coxswain. It was a sweep rowing event, with the rowers each having one oar (and thus each rowing on one side). The course used the 2000 metres distance that became the Olympic standard in 1912 (with the exception of 1948). Races were held in up to six lanes.

The competition consisted of two main rounds (semifinals and finals) as well as a repechage. 

 Semifinals: Two heats of five boats each. The top boat in each heat (2 boats total) advanced directly to the "A" final, while all other boats (8 total) went to the repechage.
 Repechage: Two heats of four boats each. The top two boats in each heat (4 boats total) rejoined the semifinal winners in the "A" final, with the 3rd and 4th place boats in each heat (4 boats total) eliminated from medal contention and competing in the "B" final.
 Finals: The "A" final consisted of the top six boats, awarding medals and 4th through 6th place. The "B" final featured the next four boats, ranking them 7th through 10th.

Schedule

All times are Eastern Daylight Time (UTC-4)

Results

Semifinals

Semifinal 1

Semifinal 2

Repechage

Repechage heat 1

Repechage heat 2

Finals

Final B

Final A

References

Sources
 

Rowing at the 1996 Summer Olympics
Men's events at the 1996 Summer Olympics